Benjamin Hundeyin is a Nigerian police superintendent. He is the incumbent Public Relations Officer of the Lagos State Police Command.

Education 
Hundeyin earned his bachelor's degree in English Language from the Lagos State University, and a master's degree in Legal Criminology and Security Psychology from the University of Ibadan. He equally holds a Certificate in Civil–Military Coordination from the Martin Luther Agwai International Leadership and Peacekeeping Training Centre, Jaji, Kaduna State, Nigeria.

Career 
Hundeyin is an associate of Nigerian Institute of Public Relations, the International Public Relations Association; Chartered Institute of Personnel Management of Nigeria.

In 2020, he served as a member of the Nigerian contingent to the United Nations–African Union Mission in Darfur, Sudan.

In March 2022, Hundeyin replaced Adekunle Ajisebutu as the Public Relations Officer of the Lagos State Police Command.

References 

Living people
Nigerian police officers
Nigerian police chiefs
Lagos State University alumni
University of Ibadan alumni
Year of birth missing (living people)